Janoušek (feminine Janoušková) is a Czech surname, it may refer to:
Anna Janoušková, Czech cross-country skier
Antonín Janoušek, Czech communist
Bohumil Janoušek, Czech rower
Gabriel Janoušek, Czech canoer
Jiří Janoušek, Czech footballer
Karel Janoušek, Czechoslovak Air Force commander
Ladislav Janoušek, Czech cyclist
Miloš Janoušek (1952-2023), Slovak folk musician
Roman Janoušek, Czech lobbyist
Roman Janoušek, Czech footballer
Václav Janoušek, Czech canoer
Věra Janoušková, Czech sculptor, painter and graphic artist

Czech-language surnames
Patronymic surnames
Surnames from given names